Nenjiang Road is the name of a station on Shanghai Metro Line 8. This station began operation on December 29, 2007. It is located at Zhongyuan Road and Nenjiang Road, in Yangpu District. It is also located near an Auchan superstore.

Surface connections 
Passengers can transfer to buses 28, 61, 139, 522, 851, 854, and Bridge Line No. 3 (大桥三线) from this station.

References 

Railway stations in Shanghai
Shanghai Metro stations in Yangpu District
Railway stations in China opened in 2007
Line 8, Shanghai Metro